Spilarctia daltonica is a moth in the family Erebidae. It was described by Karel Černý in 2011. It is found in the Philippines.

References

Moths described in 2011
daltonica